In the Doubles competition of the 1996 Copenhagen Open, Mark Keil and Peter Nyborg were the defending champions but they played with different partners that year(Keil with Jeff Tarango and Nyborg with Menno Oosting).

Keil and Tarango lost in the first round to Lorenzo Manta and Pavel Vízner.

Nyborg and Oosting lost in the quarterfinals to Wayne Arthurs and Andrew Kratzmann.

Libor Pimek and Byron Talbot won in the final 7–6, 3–6, 6–3 against Arthurs and Kratzmann.

Seeds

  Mark Keil /  Jeff Tarango (first round)
  Peter Nyborg /  Menno Oosting (quarterfinals)
  David Adams /  Andrei Olhovskiy (quarterfinals)
  Neil Broad /  Piet Norval (quarterfinals)

Draw

External links
 1996 Copenhagen Open Doubles draw

1996 Copenhagen Open – 2
1996 ATP Tour